Miljonuten  is a mountain located in the municipality of Hol in Buskerud, Norway.

External links
Miljonuten coord

Hol
Mountains of Viken